Newfoundland and Labrador is the ninth-most populous province in Canada, with 510,550 residents recorded in the 2021 Canadian Census, and is the seventh-largest in land area, with .

The towns were created by the Government of Newfoundland and Labrador in accordance with the Municipalities Act, 1999, whereas the three cities were each incorporated under their own provincial statutes. Inuit community governments were created in accordance with the 2005 Labrador Inuit Land Claims Agreement Act. These acts grant the power to enact local bylaws and the responsibility to provide local government services.

St. John's is Newfoundland and Labrador's capital and largest municipality by population and land area. Little Bay Islands is its smallest municipality by population, and Brent's Cove is the smallest municipality by land area.

Cities 
Newfoundland and Labrador has three cities that had a total population of 152,335 in the 2021 Canadian Census. Corner Brook is the smallest city by population in the province, with 19,333 residents.

The three cities are governed under their own provincial legislation – the City of St. John's Act, the City of Mount Pearl Act, and the City of Corner Brook Act. These acts give them the power to enact local bylaws and the responsibility to provide local government services.

Towns 
The Municipalities Act, 1999 is the legislation enabling the Lieutenant-Governor in Council to incorporate, amalgamate, and disorganize towns in Newfoundland and Labrador upon recommendation by the Minister of Municipal Affairs and Environment. It also provides opportunities for towns to annex areas, and establish or alter their boundaries. The prerequisite to undertake these actions is the preparation of a feasibility report, which includes a requirement for a public hearing.

Newfoundland and Labrador has 270 towns that had a total population of 304,895 in the 2021 Canadian Census. Fifteen of those towns are in Labrador. The province's newest town is George's Brook-Milton, which incorporated on May 8, 2018.

Inuit community governments 
Newfoundland and Labrador has five Inuit community governments that had a total population of 2,323 in the 2021 Canadian Census.

All five Inuit community governments are within Nunatsiavut, the Inuit Land Claims Area of Labrador. The five Inuit community governments were formed in 2005 with the signing of the Labrador Inuit Land Claims Agreement. The agreement granted them powers similar to other types of municipal governments in the province such as the establishment of a local government, municipal parks and recreation, public libraries, and public advertising. Each community elects at-large a council comprising an angajukkak (mayor) and Inuit community councillors.

List of municipalities

See also 

List of census agglomerations in Atlantic Canada
List of communities in Newfoundland and Labrador
List of designated places in Newfoundland and Labrador
List of population centres in Newfoundland and Labrador

References

External links 
Newfoundland and Labrador: Municipal and Provincial Affairs

Municipalities